The merge window is a software development process which is sometimes used by large projects.

The merge window is a period of time that occurs directly after the release of a new version of the software. During this time, many patches are merged and hence have a long time to get scrutinized and tested before the next release.

The Linux kernel has used the merge window process since July 2005 with the release of version 2.6.14. Since then, every 2.6.*, 3.* and 4.* release has been followed by a two-week merge window.

This causes much work for the project maintainers who have to merge all the patches. The process may be split up with people who inspect, approve and merge the patches.

References

External links 
 Development process of u-boot

Version control
Software project management